Stadyum is a light-rail station on the Konak Tram of the Tram İzmir system in İzmir, Turkey. Originally named Demir, it is located along Şehitler Avenue and consists of a side platform and one track. Only Halkapınar-bound (Eastbound) trams stop at Stadyum, since westbound trams travel along Liman Avenue one block north. The station is located next to the former Alsancak Stadium.

The station opened on 24 March 2018.

Connections
ESHOT operates city bus service on Şehitler Avenue.

References

Railway stations opened in 2018
2018 establishments in Turkey
Konak District
Tram transport in İzmir